The Other Side of the Moon is a compilation album by The Cardigans. It features B-sides and rarities that never made it onto the albums and were previously only available on singles.
It was released only in Japan and Australia on 5 December 1997.

Track listing
 "War (First Try)" (Nina Persson, Peter Svensson) – 4:09 [previously unreleased]
 "I Figured Out" (Magnus Sveningsson, Svensson) – 2:05 [from the single "Black Letter Day"]
 "Plain Parade" (Sveningsson, Svensson) – 3:31 [from the single "Sick And Tired"]
 "Laika" (Svensson) – 1:20 [from the single "Sick And Tired"]
 "Pooh Song" (Alfheim, Lagerberg, Persson, Sveningsson, Svensson) – 3:15 [from the single "Sick And Tired"]
 "Mr. Crowley" (Ozzy Osbourne) – 2:35 [from the single "Carnival"]
 "Emmerdale" (Svensson) – 2:25 [from the single "Carnival"]
 "The Boys Are Back in Town" (Phil Lynott) – 4:04 [from the single "Hey! Get Out of My Way"]
 "Carnival (Puck Version)" (Persson, Sveningsson, Svensson) – 2:52 [from the single "Hey! Get Out of My Way"]
 "Nasty Sunny Beam" (Persson, Svensson) - 2:54 [from the single "Lovefool"]
 "Iron Man (First Try)" (Geezer Butler, Tony Iommi, Osbourne, Bill Ward) – 3:39 [from the single "Lovefool"]
 "Blah Blah Blah" (Persson, Svensson) – 3:00 [from the single "Been It"]
 "Losers (First Try)" (Persson, Svensson) - 3:16 [from the single "Been It"]
 "Country Hell" (Sveningsson, Svensson) - 2:47 [from the single "Your New Cuckoo"]
 "After All" (Sveningsson, Svensson) - 2:37 [from the single "Rise And Shine"]
 "Cocktail Party Bloody Cocktail Party" (Svensson) - 15:47 (a medley of songs from Life) [from the single "Rise And Shine" (re-release)]

Charts

References

External links 
 The Other Side of the Moon on cardigans.com

The Cardigans albums
B-side compilation albums
1997 compilation albums
Stockholm Records compilation albums